The Lost Empire may refer to:

Tarzan and the Lost Empire, a 1929 novel by Edgar Rice Burroughs
Lost Empires (novel), a 1965 novel by J. B. Priestley
Lost Empires, a 1986 television miniseries adapted from the Priestley novel
The Lost Empire (1984 film), a fantasy adventure directed by Jim Wynorski
The Lost Empire, alternate title for the 2001 NBC/SciFi Channel television mini-series The Monkey King
Atlantis: The Lost Empire, a 2001 Disney animated feature
Atlantis: The Lost Empire (soundtrack), the soundtrack album of the Disney film
Atlantis: The Lost Empire (video game), a game based on the Disney film
Lost Empire, a 2007 turn-based strategy computer game by Pollux Gamelabs
Lost Empire (novel), a 2010 adventure novel by Clive Cussler

See also
:Category:Former countries
:Category:Former empires